Piigs is a 2017 documentary film which investigates the causes and the effects of austerity imposed by the European Union on its subject countries, especially in Southern Europe. The film suggests that austerity policies are aggravating the effects of the financial crisis, especially in those countries that economists have called the "PIIGS" (an acronym of Portugal, Ireland, Italy, Greece and Spain)—states that suffered high public debt and weak economies.

Contributors
 Noam Chomsky
 Paolo Barnard
 Yanis Varoufakis
 Erri De Luca
 Stephanie Kelton
 Warren Mosler
 Paul De Grauwe
 Federico Rampini
 Claudia Bonfini

References

2017 films
Documentary films about politics
Films with live action and animation
2010s Italian-language films
Italian documentary films
Italian independent films
2010s English-language films